Mikadotrochus gotoi is a species of large sea snail, a marine gastropod mollusk in the family Pleurotomariidae, the slit snails.

Description
The length of the shell varies between 40 mm and 62 mm.

Distribution
This marine species occurs on the continental slope off the Philippines.

References

 Anseeuw, P. & Goto, Y. (1996). The Living Pleurotomariidae. A synopsis of the Recent Pleurotomariidae including colour plates of all extant type specimens. Yao, Japan : Elle Scientific Publications. 1st Edn 202 pp.

External links
 MNHN, Paris: holotype
 To Encyclopedia of Life
 To World Register of Marine Species
 

Pleurotomariidae
Gastropods described in 1990